Tim Henman was the defending champion but lost in the second round to Guillermo Cañas.

Tommy Haas won in the final 6–2, 7–6(8–6), 6–4 against Cañas.

Seeds

Draw

Final

Section 1

Section 2

External links
 2001 CA-TennisTrophy draw

Vienna Open
2001 ATP Tour